The name Amber has been used for one tropical cyclones in the west Pacific Ocean and one in the south Indian Ocean.

West Pacific Ocean:
 Typhoon Amber (1997) (T9716, 18W, Miling), a Category 3 typhoon that hit Taiwan and then mainland China

Southeast Indian Ocean:
 Cyclone Amber (1968), formed to the west of the Cocos (Keeling) Islands and did not approach land

Pacific typhoon set index articles
Australian region cyclone set index articles